Atomsk, first published in 1949, is a Cold War spy novel by "Carmichael Smith", one of several pseudonyms used by American writer Paul Linebarger, who wrote fiction most prolifically as Cordwainer Smith.

Plot
Drawing on Linebarger's own expertise in the field of psychological warfare, the book is a study of the personality of a U.S. operative (Major Michael Dugan) who has little in common with James Bond except his extreme resourcefulness under cover and in danger.  A man of many identities who sees himself to some extent as a blank sheet, he goes from calling himself "Comrade Nobody" to saying "I'm anybody".  The novel also has an underlying, albeit devious and ambiguous, message of peace.  As one character says, learning to like people is "the only way to win wars, or even better, to get out of them."

Publication history
Written two years after Winston Churchill's Sinews of Peace address, Atomsk is the first espionage novel of the Cold War, inaugurating a genre exemplified by writers such as Ian Fleming and John Le Carré. 

Linebarger's third published novel, it has long been out of print. Paper copies regularly command figures in the hundreds of U.S. dollars in the second-hand market, even though it is also available as an inexpensive e-book.

References

External links
Atomsk: A Novel of Suspense (cordwainersmith.com)

1949 American novels
Cold War spy novels
Novels by Cordwainer Smith